The Bryan Lions are the athletic teams representing Bryan College, located in Dayton, Tennessee, in intercollegiate sports as members of the National Association of Intercollegiate Athletics (NAIA), primarily competing in the Appalachian Athletic Conference (AAC) since the 2001–02 academic year. They were also members of the National Christian College Athletic Association (NCCAA), primarily competing independently in the Mid-East Region of the Division I level.

Varsity teams
Bryan competes in 17 intercollegiate varsity sports: Men's sports include baseball, basketball, cross country, golf, soccer and track & field. While women's sports include basketball, cross country, golf, soccer, softball, track & field and volleyball; and co-ed sports include cheerleading, fishing, martial arts and shooting.

Men's soccer
In the late 1970s, the men's soccer team participated in the NCCAA (National Christian College Athletic Association). While in the association, the soccer team won three NCCAA Championships in 1977, 1978, and 1979. In recent years, the men's soccer team has competed in the AAC district tournaments and NAIA national tournaments, and subsequently in 2018 and 2019, the team made it to the championship round of the conference tournament, however, they lost both years to Reinhardt University and Union College respectively.

Women's soccer
In 2010, the women's soccer team received the NAIA scholar team award for maintaining the 14th  national highest GPA among NAIA programs. In 2017, the Lady Lions won the regular season championship and represented the college in the NAIA national tournament. In the 2017 season, they recorded the most wins in the history of the program.

Men's basketball
In 2013, Bryan College played in the AAC basketball tournament championship game, losing to the Tennessee Wesleyan Bulldogs. In 2016, a Bryan College player set the all-time points and rebounding records for his team, while also leading the NAIA (D-II) scoring above the total average points.

Women's basketball
The women's basketball program competed in the NAIA (D-II) national tournament after winning the AAC tournament in 2017, 2018, and 2019. In 2019, the team finished with a 31–2 record, including winning in the AAC regular season and tournament championship.

Baseball
Baseball was added to the athletic program in 2002. In 2012, the team represented the college at the AAC tournament in the championship game. In the 2012 season, they set the record for the most wins in school history. After winning the AAC regular season, the Lions represented Bryan College at the 2019 NAIA national tournament.

Softball
In 2010, Bryan College restarted the softball program, with games beginning in the spring of 2011. The Lady Lions struggled in their first season with an overall record of 6-40. Recently, the Lions have represented the college at the AAC tournament and upset multiple top-seeded programs. The Lions finished the 2019 season with a leading record of 20–28.

Volleyball
In 2013, the program hosted its first NAIA national tournament match after winning the AAC. The Lady Lions recorded four straight AAC regular season championships including a 2014 season that was undefeated in conference play. In 2019, the Lions represented the college in the AAC conference tournament before falling to Union College.

Men's and women's golf
Golf, both men's and women's, was added to the athletic program in 2010. Both Men and women golfers were awarded several honors, including AAC player of the year, All-American nomination, and AAC player of the week.

Fishing
In 2017, the team participated in the Carhartt Bassmaster College Series. a National Championship program with several groups of anglers. The Lions beautifully won the National Championship and the 2017 Cabela's School of the Year Award. In 2019, two students won the Bassmaster College Classic.

Shooting
Bryan College announced an inaugural shooting team beginning in the Fall of 2020.The competitions will begin in the Fall of 2020. The shooting team will be competing in the Scholastic Clay Target Program and the National Intercollegiate Clay Target Championships respectively. Meanwhile, six events are included in the competitions including American Trap, International Trap, American Skeet, International Skeet, Sporting Clays, and Five Stand. The shooting team is a co-educational team and will be competing in Division III of the Scholastic Clay Target Program.

Martial Arts
In 2017, Bryan College announced the introduction of a Martial Arts Academy that competes across the south eastern region. Students train in Isshinryu karate. The Martial Arts Academy is a co-educational program open to male and female undergraduate students alike.

Rivalries
All rival athletic programs that compete against the Lions are in the Appalachian Athletic Conference.

 Tennessee Wesleyan
 Reinhardt
 Union

References

External links
 

Athletic Club Femenino